Phothecla is a Neotropical genus of butterflies in the family Lycaenidae.

Species
Phothecla photismos (Druce, 1907) Ecuador, Bolivia, Venezuela
Phothecla thespia (Hewitson, 1870) Ecuador, Peru

References

External links
images of Phothecla at Butterflies of the Americas

Eumaeini
Lycaenidae of South America
Lycaenidae genera